Fiona "Felsie" Bayne (born 10 May 1966 in Perth) is a Scottish curler, a two-time  (1988, 1990) and a 1998 Scottish women's champion.

She played for Great Britain at the 1998 Winter Olympics, where the British team finished in fourth place.

Teams

References

External links

(as Felsie Bayne)

1966 births
Living people
Scottish female curlers
British female curlers
Olympic curlers of Great Britain
Curlers at the 1998 Winter Olympics
Scottish curling champions
Sportspeople from Perth, Scotland